Soo-yeon, also spelled Su-yeon or Soo-yun, is a Korean unisex given name, primarily feminine. Its meaning differs based on the hanja used to write each syllable of the name. There are 67 hanja with the reading "soo" and 39 hanja with the reading "yeon" on the South Korean government's official list of hanja which may be registered for use in given names.

People with this name include:

Entertainers
Kang Soo-yeon (born 1966), South Korean actress
Oh Soo-yeon (born 1968), South Korean female television screenwriter
Chunja (singer) (born Hong Su-yeon, 1979), South Korean female singer
Cha Soo-yeon (born 1981), South Korean actress
Han Soo-yeon (born Lee Mae-ri, 1983), South Korean actress
Jessica Jung (Korean name Jung Soo-yeon, born 1989), Korean-American female singer, former member of girl group Girls' Generation

Sportspeople
Kang Soo-yun (born 1976), South Korean female golfer
Kim Soo-yeon (born 1983), South Korean male footballer
Kim Soo-yun (born 1983), South Korean female footballer
Seo Su-yeon (born 1986), South Korean female para table tennis player
Soo Yeon Lee (born 1984), South Korean female table tennis player and model
Choi Soo-yeon (born 1990), South Korean female sabre fencer
Back Su-yeon (born 1991), South Korean female swimmer
Jo Su-yeon (born 1994), South Korean female handball player
Kim Su-yeon (born 2001), South Korean female pair skater
Eom Su-yeon (born 2001), South Korean female ice hockey player

Others
Won Soo-yeon (born 1961), South Korean female manhwa artist
Oh Soo-yeon (novelist) (born 1964), South Korean female novelist
Lea Seong (born Seong Su-yeon, 1989), South Korean fashion designer

Fictional characters
Bae Su-yeon, in 2003 South Korean film A Tale of Two Sisters
Ji Soo-yeon, in 2013 South Korean television series Iris II: New Generation
Lee Soo-yeon, in 2012 South Korean television series Missing You
Yoon Su-yun, in 2016 South Korean film Train to Busan
Lee Soo-yeon, in 2018 South Korean television series Where Stars Land

See also
List of Korean given names

References

Korean unisex given names